Apple Blossom Festival can refer to several different events:

 Annapolis Valley Apple Blossom Festival, in Nova Scotia's Annapolis Valley
 Shenandoah Apple Blossom Festival, in Virginia's Shenandoah Valley
 Washington State Apple Blossom Festival, in Wenatchee, Washington
 Williamson Apple Blossom Festival, in Williamson, New York
 Gettysburg Apple Blossom Festival, in Gettysburg, Pennsylvania
 St. Joseph Apple Blossom Festival, in St. Joseph, Missouri